Beaudley is a historic home located at Tyaskin, Wicomico County, Maryland, United States.  It was built about 1795, and consists of a -story, side-hall, Flemish bond brick-ended frame house with a gable roof.  A single-story hyphen joins a slightly taller single-story early-19th-century kitchen to the main house. Attached to the house is a two-story, one-room frame addition erected around 1850. Also on the property are several small outbuildings and a Walter family cemetery.

Beaudley was listed on the National Register of Historic Places in 2001.

References

External links
, including photo from 2000, at Maryland Historical Trust

Houses in Wicomico County, Maryland
Houses on the National Register of Historic Places in Maryland
Federal architecture in Maryland
Houses completed in 1795
National Register of Historic Places in Wicomico County, Maryland